Conch soup and conch chowder are soup dishes made with conch that are traditional in various Caribbean island cuisines as well as the cuisine of Honduras. Conch chowder is also a traditional food of the Florida Keys.

References

American soups
Caribbean cuisine
Belizean cuisine
Honduran cuisine
Florida cuisine
Florida Keys
American seafood dishes